Repino is a rural locality (a selo) in Turgenevskoye Rural Settlement, Melenkovsky District, Vladimir Oblast, Russia. The population was 30 as of 2010. There are 5 streets.

Geography 
Repino is located 41 km northeast of Melenki (the district's administrative centre) by road. Urvanovo is the nearest rural locality.

References 

Rural localities in Melenkovsky District
Melenkovsky Uyezd